Daphnella sandwicensis is a species of sea snail, a marine gastropod mollusk in the family Raphitomidae.

Description
The length of the shell varies between 8 mm and 11 mm.

Distribution
This marine species occurs off Hawaii

References

 Severns, M. (2011). Shells of the Hawaiian Islands - The Sea Shells. Conchbooks, Hackenheim. 564 pp.
 Liu J.Y. [Ruiyu] (ed.). (2008). Checklist of marine biota of China seas. China Science Press. 1267 pp.

External links
 
 Gastropods.com: Daphnella (Daphnella) sandwicensis
  Kay, E. A. (1979). Hawaiian marine shells. Reef and shore fauna of Hawaii. Section 4: Mollusca. Bernice P. Bishop Museum Special Publications. 64xviii + 1-653
 Moretzsohn, Fabio, and E. Alison Kay. "HAWAIIAN MARINE MOLLUSCS." (1995)

sandwicensis
Gastropods described in 1860